Take a Thief: A Novel of Valdemar  is a 2001 young-adult novel by American writer Mercedes Lackey. It is the third in the Heralds of Valdemar series, and introduces Skif, an orphaned pickpocket who finds a magical horse and who later appears in the subsequent Valdemar book Arrows of the Queen.

Plot summary
Skif's parents are dead, and he lives with his horrible uncle, who does not make much of an attempt to take care of him. Because of this, Skif turns to thievery so that he can obtain food. One day, after dressing up like a page and stealing food from Lord Orthallen's table, he hides in the laundry room. There he inadvertently meets with a fellow and more experienced thief, and begs to be trained in the art. The boy gives in, and Skif finds himself living permanently with him, other boys and Bazie (their teacher).

Eventually Skif becomes a master at the trade, and is glad for good food and clothes. One night after a successful theft, Skif comes home to find his house in flames and his comrades dead.

In need of money and a home, Skif steals a beautiful white horse, only to find out she is a Companion and he is her Chosen. This means that the two are linked for life, and must work together to aid Valdemar. Skif figures that being a Herald is better than nothing, and travels with his new Companion, Cymry, to the Herald's Collegium. There the circumstances of his life improve, and Skif finds friends, books, a comfortable bed, and good education. However, he still feels that one thing is missing from his life: revenge for the lives of his friends and beloved mentor Bazie. In the end Skif helps Herald Alberich, the weaponsmaster, take the criminal down, and earns his name as a hero of Valdemar.

References

External links
 

2001 American novels
Valdemar Universe
American fantasy novels
Novels about orphans